Kabali can refer to:

 Kabali
 Kabalı, Vezirköprü
 Kabalı, Yenice